Darcy Marie Padilla (born 1965) is an American documentary and photojournalist who specializes in contemporary issues and long-term projects and is the recipient of three  World Press Photo award for her work "The Julie Project".

Personal background

Padilla was born and raised in Northern California. She took up photography at the age of 12 when she got her first SLR camera and was editor for her school yearbook. She earned a BA in journalism and writing from San Francisco State University and an MFA from UC Davis. She started out  as a photo intern at The New York Times, but turned a staff job to pursue an independent career and her own documentary projects. She resides in San Francisco, CA and Madison, WI. She is a member Agence VU’ in Paris and currently lives in San Francisco.

Career

Early in her career she interned at many prestigious newspapers, including The New York Times and The Washington Post. She is a photographer for Agence Vu.
Padilla also teaches photography at the college level. Her work focuses on social issues such as urban poverty, drug addiction and HIV.

Notable works

The Julie Project  
Padilla photographed Julie Baird for from the time she met her 1993 until Julie's death from AIDS in September 2010. "The Julie Project" follows the life of Julie Baird through raising her family, dealing with HIV/AIDS, struggling with a drug addiction, and death. The project lasted 18 years. The first series took second place in the 2011 World Press Photo contemporary issues competition. The second series, "Family Love, 1993-2014," won the 2015 World Press Photo Award and was presented with 30 images.

American Prisons
Padilla first started documenting prisoners in the AIDS ward of the state prison in Vacaville, California in 1990. A series from that project over the course of one year  was awarded with a prize from the Alexia Foundation.

Awards
 1995: John Simon Guggenheim Fellowship
 2010: W. Eugene Smith Award, W. Eugene Smith Memorial Fund.
 2011: World Press Photo competition, Second place in the Contemporary Issues category for "The Julie Project".
 2012: World Press Photo competition, Honorable mention in the Daily Life category for Jason & Elyssa. 
 2015: World Press Photo competition, First place in the Long Term Projects category for "The Julie Project".

Publications
 Family Love. Paris: Martinière, 2014. . French-language edition.

References

External links 
 Darcy Padilla (2015 Photo Contest)
 Agence VU
 Facing Change: Documenting America

1965 births
Living people
University of California, Davis alumni
American women journalists
American women photographers
Photographers from California
Social documentary photographers
21st-century American women
Women photojournalists